Lo que le pasó a Santiago ("What Happened to Santiago") is a 1989 Puerto Rican film written and directed by Jacobo Morales. The film tells the story of a recently retired widower who meets a mysterious young lady who disrupts his daily routines. Lo que le pasó a Santiago was the first and only Puerto Rican production to be nominated for an Academy Award for Best Foreign Language Film.  In 2011 AMPAS revised its rules to make films from U.S. territories such as Puerto Rico ineligible for the Foreign Language Film award.

Plot
Santiago, a widowed man visits his wife at the cemetery. Near the location of the filming of a movie, Santiago meets a mysterious woman. She is very pleasant, and talks to him. They exchange gifts, but then upon saying their good-byes, she doesn't tell him her name and he wonders if he'll ever see her again. They bump into each other again and the woman continues to be pleasant and tells him her name is Angelina. Angelina informs him that she has been watching him and saw when he mailed a letter to someone.

Santiago, the widowed man and his daughter often argue, mainly because his daughter is going through a divorce and her father, Santiago prefers she not divorce. Later as the daughter and her husband argue over divorce matters in the presence of their young son, Santiago engages the boy in conversation about snow: that the only time he saw snow was when it was bought to Puerto Rico by plane. Santiago, looks for employment but is interviewed by someone who is obviously not interested in hiring him because of his age.

The third time Santiago and Angelina meet, they listen to traditional guitar music and dance. Following that, they go to a park and row a boat through a waterway. Angelina is always smiling and happy.

Then Santiago's daughter continues to be argumentative. At the airport, she and her father Santiago are talking about her move to New York City for 3 months and that she was planning to leave her son with her husband, Gerard, but her husband has not shown up at the airport. Frustrated, she leaves her son with her father telling the boy to behave and obey his  (father). As Santiago is leaving with his sad grandson, the boy's father shows up to take him.

One day while sitting at home, Santiago unexpectedly receives a call on his landline from Angelina. Santiago had never given her his phone number and she explains that she had to call every person in the phone book with his name to find him. They make plans to meet in San Juan. Eddie, Santiago's son, is depressed and tells his father that he has given away his guitar because of his depression. In a pep talk, Santiago tells his son they have to make it, and that they'll travel together because traveling will be therapeutic. Then when Eddie notices the scenic beach painting on his father's wall, the gift from Angelina, and asks him about it, Santiago tells his son that he's very happy because he has met Angelina. However, worried about a lack of information about Angelina, Santiago has secretly hired an investigator to help him learn more about her.

Early the next morning, Santiago and Angelina are at her home, a big, beautiful, Spanish-style home and, upon entering, Santiago finds the home is immaculate, with large majestic windows, and a functioning old phonograph. As the phonograph music plays, Santiago peruses the black-and-white photos around her home. She prepares and they have breakfast while they share more about themselves. She tells him her grandfather fought for Spain in the Spanish-American war, and built the home. In turn, he tells her no one in his family was famous, except maybe his great-aunt who was a bootlegger during prohibition; in summary that he's widowed, and retired after having worked as an accountant for forty years, that he has three children, and is now here with her. They walk through the fields enjoying the day until they get caught in a rainstorm. They change into bathrobes and proceed to her bedroom and she offers him a massage with rubbing alcohol, preferably on the bed. They remove their bathrobes and later, as they lay together, she tells him that he should keep his eyes closed because, were he to open them, he would know that she's a ghost.

They depart after professing their love for each other. Santiago gets lost driving in the rain in the dark while reflecting on the fact that he has seen Angelina's home, and the flowers in her garden before, in his dreams. His car gets stuck in the mud and upon existing his car, he slips down a ravine, but finds the perfect stick to get his car out of the mud. As his son paces back and forth, before a ticking grandfather clock, Santiago finally arrives home and lets him know what happened, explaining that Angelina's house is the most beautiful house on the most spectacular land he's ever seen.

After leaving the hospital for a bout of pneumonia, Santiago is met, at his home, by the investigator who shares surprising information about Angelina's real life. It turns out she had a tragic life and, after hearing it, Santiago says he remembers reading the story in the papers. As a daughter of an important influential family, Lela (Angelina's real name) was forced to give up her baby daughter who'd been born out of wedlock. For this reason, she shot her father, paralyzing him, then she ended up in and out of mental institutions. After hearing the news, Santiago is saddened. In his next visit, he finds her elegantly dressed, as always. Santiago doesn't let Angelina know that he knows the truth about her and they, presumably, continue their relationship.

Cast
Tommy Muñiz - Santiago Rodríguez
Gladys Rodríguez - Angelina
Jacobo Morales - Aristides Esquilín
René Monclova - Eddie
Johanna Rosaly - Nereida
Roberto Vigoreaux - Gerardo

Production

Jacobo Morales wrote the script while working on the play Los muchachos de la alegría, an adaptation of a Neil Simon script, which featured Tommy Muñiz. As they were in rehearsals, Morales realized that Muñiz was the "singular performer" he wanted for his film project. He said in a 2014 interview that since he had the idea "very clear, I wrote it really fast; like a little over a month". Morales invited Muñiz' son, Pedro, to serve as associate producer while Morales' wife, Blanca Silvia Eró, served as executive producer. Morales also chose Gladys Rodríguez to play opposite Muñiz, for considering her a very "ductile" actress with which he had worked for decades before. Morales said of Rodríguez, "the experiences with her had been very positive and we had good communication. Her role not only suited her for her physicality, but also for her temperament."

Morales described the film as a very "simple" film with "great performances from Tommy, Gladys, and René Monclova", who played Muñíz' son. The production had a budget of $500,000. Although Morales wrote the script fairly quickly, filming was delayed for around 40 days. According to Morales, at the time it was the only one of his feature films that had gone over its initially planned shooting schedule. It was filmed in Old San Juan and Santa Isabel.

Release 

The film's original release was delayed because of the passage of Hurricane Hugo in September 1989. It was ultimately released in November of the same year. After receiving critical acclaim, the film was also exhibited in various international festivals, including the Festival de Cine Iberoamericano de Huelva in Spain, the Latin American Film Festival in Washington, and the Festival du Cinéma Espagnol de Nantes in France. According to Morales, he wasn't "thinking in success, but in a story that grabbed my attention. I always try to do everything in function of the story. The star is the film".

Reception 

Lo que le pasó a Santiago was generally well received by critics and audiences. Although it doesn't have an official rating on Rotten Tomatoes because of the lack of certified critics reviews, it still holds an approval rating of 81% among the audience based on 417 ratings. In 1990, the film was nominated for the Best Foreign Language Film at the 62nd Academy Awards. According to Morales, it was associate producer, Pedro Muñiz, who prompted them to submit the film for consideration. Before submitting it to the Academy, they had to budget the addition of English subtitles, which they did in "record time" and the film was successfully submitted before the January 5, 1990 deadline. However, it lost to Giuseppe Tornatore's Cinema Paradiso.

Awards

See also
Cinema of Puerto Rico
List of films set in Puerto Rico
List of Puerto Ricans in the Academy Awards
List of submissions to the 62nd Academy Awards for Best Foreign Language Film
List of Puerto Rican submissions for the Academy Award for Best Foreign Language Film

References

External links
 
Entire film (English subtitles) on Odnoklassniki

Puerto Rican films
Films set in Puerto Rico
Films shot in Puerto Rico
Films directed by Jacobo Morales
1989 drama films
1989 films
Spanish-language American films
1980s Spanish-language films
Films about old age